Pontirolo Nuovo is a comune (municipality) in the Province of Bergamo in the Italian region of Lombardy, located about  northeast of Milan and about  northeast of Bergamo.

The municipality of Pontirolo Nuovo contains the frazione (subdivision) Fornasotto.

Pontirolo Nuovo borders the following municipalities: Arcene, Boltiere, Brembate, Canonica d'Adda, Ciserano, Fara Gera d'Adda, Treviglio.

Demographic evolution

References